Buyisiwe Sondezi became the first woman in Africa to obtain a Doctor of Philosophy (PhD) in Experimental physics of highly correlated matter when she graduated at University of Johannesburg on 23 September 2014.

Academic life
Buyisiwe is the first born child and a sister of ten siblings. She grew up in Newcastle and learnt science at a rural school. The school had no laboratory. "I had to picture how things are, because the school had no lab. I was just told if you mix 'one' and 'two' you get a 'three'. We relied on what the textbook said," says Dr Sondezi. She saw laboratory equipment for the first time while studying towards her degree at Vista University in Soweto, which is now part of the University of Johannesburg. Buyisiwe graduated with a Bachelor of Science (BSc) in Physics, Chemistry and Statistics.

Buyisiwe worked briefly as a teacher at Sandringham High School, Johannesburg in 2003. In 2005, she lectured Fundamental Physics class at Rand Afrikaans University and demonstrated the second year Physics Practicals at the same university.

She holds a Honours and master's degrees in Physics, researching properties of solar cells. She started her PhD in the same direction, however, she switched the topic of her doctorate to highly correlated matter in experimental physics in 2007.

South African Nuclear Energy Corporation (NECSA) employed her as a scientist in the Radiation Utilisation Division between 2005 and 2007. In 2007, she started working for University of Johannesburg as a lecturer.

In 2009, she won the Department of Science and Technology's women in Science award and was nominated as one of Cosmopolitan magazine's "Fun and Fearless Women".

In 2012, she was named one of Mail & Guardian's 200 Young South Africans, in the Science and Technology category.

Buyisiwe made news headlines as the first woman in Africa to earn a PhD in her field in October 2014.

She has written publications in collaboration with various physicists based around the globe.

In her spare time, she tutors Mathematics and Science to pupils.

References

Living people
South African physicists
Academic staff of the University of Johannesburg
South African inventors
Year of birth missing (living people)